Eduardo Alexandre Baptista (born 30 March 1970), is a Brazilian professional football coach who was most recently in charge of Novorizontino.

Career
Born in Campinas, São Paulo, Baptista started playing for Juventus as a central defender. However, due to his lack of temper on the field, he was advised to leave football by his father, Nelsinho.

In 2002, after spells at clubs in his native state, Baptista joined his father's staff at Goiás, as a fitness coach. The duo remained together for the following nine years, only splitting due to the Japanese tsunami in 2011, when both were at Kashiwa Reysol; Eduardo subsequently returned to Sport Recife (club which he already worked from 2007 to 2009) while Nelsinho remained at Kashiwa.

On 31 January 2014 Baptista was appointed interim coach, replacing fired Geninho. On 14 February he was definitely appointed as head coach, and led the side to both Campeonato Pernambucano and Copa do Nordeste winning campaigns.

On 17 September 2015, Baptista left Sport and was appointed at Fluminense, replacing fired Enderson Moreira. On 25 February 2016, after only two wins in six matches, he was sacked by Flu. On 15 April, he replaced Alexandre Gallo at Ponte Preta's reign.

Baptista took Ponte to an impressive eighth place in the league, only four points shy of qualifying for the continental championship. On 2 December 2016 he resigned, and signed a one-year contract with Palmeiras fourteen days later.

On 4 May 2017, Baptista was relieved from his duties at Verdão. He was named Atlético Paranaense head coach on 23 May, but was sacked nonetheless on 10 July.

On 20 September 2017, Baptista returned to Ponte. Dismissed the following 9 March, he took over Coritiba on 16 April 2018, but was sacked from the latter club on 10 August.

On 15 August 2018, Baptista returned to Sport, replacing Claudinei Oliveira and joining the club four months after his father Nelsinho left the very same role. He resigned on 24 September, after just eight matches, and was announced as Vila Nova head coach on 23 February 2019.

Sacked by Vila on 13 July 2019, Baptista was named in charge of CSA the following 10 February. Dismissed by the latter on 30 August 2020, he was appointed head coach of Mirassol four days later.

Baptista led Mirassol to their first-ever national title in the 2020 Série D, and managed to avoid relegation in the 2021 Série C. On 11 November 2021, he was appointed Remo head coach, with a return to Mirassol for the 2022 season also agreed.

On 2 March 2022, a day after knocking out Grêmio of the 2022 Copa do Brasil, Baptista announced his departure from Mirassol. The following day, he was announced as head coach of Juventude in the top tier, but was sacked from the latter on 20 June, with the club in the last position.

On 28 August 2022, Baptista was named Atlético Goianiense head coach, but left on 29 September after just six matches. On 16 November, he was presented at Novorizontino for the upcoming season.

Personal life
Baptista is the son of Nelsinho Baptista, who is also a coach.

Coaching statistics

Honours
Sport Recife
Copa do Nordeste: 2014
Campeonato Pernambucano: 2014

Mirassol
Campeonato Brasileiro Série D: 2020

Remo
Copa Verde: 2021

References

External links

1970 births
Sportspeople from Campinas
Living people
Brazilian football managers
Campeonato Brasileiro Série A managers
Campeonato Brasileiro Série B managers
Campeonato Brasileiro Série C managers
Campeonato Brasileiro Série D managers
Sport Club do Recife managers
Fluminense FC managers
Associação Atlética Ponte Preta managers
Sociedade Esportiva Palmeiras managers
Club Athletico Paranaense managers
Coritiba Foot Ball Club managers
Vila Nova Futebol Clube managers
Centro Sportivo Alagoano managers
Mirassol Futebol Clube managers
Clube do Remo managers
Esporte Clube Juventude managers
Atlético Clube Goianiense managers
Grêmio Novorizontino managers